
Fengcheng is the pinyin romanization of various Chinese placenames. It may refer to:

Cities
 Fengcheng, Jiangxi (丰城市), a county-level city in Yichun Prefecture, Jiangxi
 Fengcheng, Liaoning (凤城市), a county-level city in Dandong Prefecture, Liaoning
 Hsinchu, a city in northern Taiwan nicknamed the "Windy City"

Towns
 Fengcheng, Lianjiang County in Lianjiang County, Fuzhou, Fujian
 Fengcheng, Anxi County (凤城镇) in Anxi County, Fujian
 Fengcheng, Yongding County (凤城镇), in Yongding County, Fujian
 Fengcheng, Guangxi (凤城镇), in Fengshan County, Guangxi
 Fengcheng, Guizhou (凤城镇), in Tianzhu County, Guizhou
 Fengcheng, Jiangsu (凤城镇), in Feng County, Jiangsu
 Fengcheng, Shandong (丰城镇) in Jimo City, Shandong
 Fengcheng, Shanghai (奉城镇) in Fengxian District, Shanghai
 Fengcheng, Yangcheng County (凤城镇), in Yangcheng County, Shanxi
 Fengcheng, Wenshui County (凤城镇), in Wenshui County, Shanxi

Subdistricts
 Daliang Subdistrict, Foshan, formerly Fengcheng, a subdistrict of Shunde, Guangdong

See also
 Phoenix and Phoenix City, occasional translations of the most common meaning of "Fengcheng" (凤城).